The Kotlyakovskoye Cemetery bombing was an attack on a funeral service in Moscow which killed fourteen people on November 11, 1996. The bombing, carried out via remote control, targeted members of an Afghan War veterans support group as well as their families. The victims were attending the funeral of Mikhail Lihodey, the former president of the veterans group who had been killed with his bodyguard in 1994. 

The bombing was carried out by Andrei Anohin and Mikhail Smurov, former members of the organisation who formed a splinter group following what was believed to be a dispute over profits from the sales of cigarettes and alcohol. Veterans organisations were exempt from import tax and thus had the potential to generate large profits, which along with the violent experiences of the veterans and the corrupt environment of gangster capitalism in the 1990s meant a number of these organisations became criminalised.

See also
List of terrorist incidents, 1996

References

Terrorist incidents in Russia in 1996
Russian veterans' organizations
People murdered by Russian-speaking organized crime
Terrorist incidents in Moscow
Improvised explosive device bombings in Russia
Events in Moscow
20th-century mass murder in Russia
Mass murder in 1996
1996 in Moscow
November 1996 events in Russia
1996 murders in Russia